Scalawag is an American nonprofit print and digital magazine focused on Southern politics and culture.

History 
Founded in 2015 in Durham, Scalawag was launched through a Kickstarter that raised over $31,000. The magazine is a left-wing, progressive outlet targeting southern audiences and documenting a range of issues with "movement journalism." Although it started primarily with volunteer labor and approximately 250 freelance writers and photographer, in 2018 the organization shifted to a membership model and offered events in order to become sustainable. 

The co-founders include Evan Walker-Wells and Sarah Bufkin. Cierra Hinton is the executive director as of fall 2018. In 2022 the organization went on hiatus for 30 days of paid leave for the entire staff.

Scalawag's work has been cited in journals,  books, and news outlets including Longreads, PEN America, Yes!, AJ+, and the New York Times.

References

External links 
 Official website

Quarterly magazines published in the United States
English-language magazines
Political magazines published in the United States
Cultural magazines published in the United States
Non-profit organizations based in the United States
Magazines established in 2015
Organizations based in Durham, North Carolina
Mass media in North Carolina
Modern liberal magazines published in the United States
Magazines published in North Carolina